The 2017 Durham County Council election was held on 4 May 2017 as part of the 2017 local elections in the United Kingdom. All 126 councillors were elected from 63 electoral divisions which returned either one, two or three county councillors each by first-past-the-post voting for a four-year term of office.

The Statement of Persons Nominated was published on 5 April 2017.

Results summary

|-
|
| Spennymoor Independents 
| align="right" |5
|
|
| align="right" |+4
|
| align="right" |1.6
| align="right" |3,523
| align="right" |+0.4
|-

|-
|
| Seaham Community Party
| align="right" |0
|
|
| align="right" |-
|
| align="right" |1.3
| align="right" |3,033
| align="right" |+1.3
|}

Results by electoral division

A − B

C − D

E − N

P − S

| colspan="5" | Spennymoor Independents hold
|-

| colspan="5" | Spennymoor Independents gain from Labour
|-

| colspan="5" | Spennymoor Independents gain from Labour
|-

T − W

| colspan="5" | Spennymoor Independents gain from Labour
|- 
| colspan="5" | Spennymoor Independents gain from Labour
|-

By-elections

| colspan="5" | Independent gain from Spennymoor Independents
|-

References

2017
2017 English local elections
2010s in County Durham